John Sydney McMahon  was an Australian rules footballer who played with Melbourne in the Victorian Football League (VFL).

Notes

External links 

1900 births
1962 deaths
Australian rules footballers from Victoria (Australia)
Melbourne Football Club players